Gratuitous Sax & Senseless Violins is the 16th album by American rock band Sparks. It was released in 1994, after an absence from the music industry of 6 years, and marked the duo's transition into a more techno/Eurobeat-influenced sound, which earned them popularity in Germany.

History

Sparks' previous album was released in 1988, and while it scored a couple of club hits in the US, had not been commercially successful. Critically the group had been receiving mixed reviews since their 1984 album Pulling Rabbits Out of a Hat. While promoting Interior Design, Sparks banded together with the French duo Les Rita Mitsouko and released the single "Singing in the Shower" which was a moderate hit in France. Sparks then went on a temporary hiatus while the brothers spent the late 1980s and early 1990s concentrating on film-making, particularly an attempt to make a Japanese manga series, Mai, The Psychic Girl, into a movie. They had hoped to have Tsui Hark direct with the actress-musician Christi Haydon voicing the lead character. Russell Mael had initially met Haydon when he admired her look while she was working on the cosmetics counter of a department store. Haydon's only experience at the time had been as a long running extra of the TV show Star Trek: The Next Generation. Despite interest from Tim Burton and six years' work on the project, it came to nothing.

In 1993 Sparks returned to the studio and released the stand-alone single "National Crime Awareness Week", and wrote and produced the single "Katharine Hepburn" for Christi Haydon. Gratuitous Sax & Senseless Violins followed in November the next year. It was produced by the duo without an additional backing band. The album had a sound that returned towards the European-synthesizer orientated sound of No. 1 In Heaven. However the songs retained an emphasis on pop song structure and a sound that was only slightly removed from that of Pet Shop Boys. The album was toured with Christi Haydon complementing the brothers on drums, as well as appearing in videos for the group. The a cappella title track "Gratuitous Sax" looked back to the equally brief opener of the band's 1974 album; Propaganda. "When Do I Get to Sing 'My Way'" makes reference to the Frank Sinatra signature-tune "My Way".

Release
Gratuitous Sax & Senseless Violins became Sparks most successful album in Germany reaching #29 and scored three hits on the German Singles chart. While the album only reached #150 on the UK Albums Chart, the singles did well enough to return the group to the Top 40, the first time since "Beat the Clock" in 1979. The lead single "When Do I Get to Sing 'My Way'"; made #7 in Germany, #38 in the UK (it was re-released in May 1995 and peaked at #32). The second single "When I Kiss You (I Hear Charlie Parker Playing)" reached #61 in Germany and #36 in the UK. The final single "Now That I Own the BBC" did less well making #81 in Germany and #60 in the UK.

"When Do I Get to Sing 'My Way'" and "When I Kiss You (I Hear Charlie Parker Playing)" managed to chart across Europe, and recommenced Sparks' popularity on the US Billboard Hot Dance Music/Club Play chart, where they reached No. 9 and #24.

Re-releases
Japanese editions of the album included "When I Kiss You (I Hear Charlie Parker Playing) (Bernard Butler's Mix)" as a bonus track. The album was re-released as first in the series Sparks – The Collection in 2006 on the groups' own record label Lil' Beethoven Records. This re-release featured new artwork, additional sleeve-notes and was packaged in a digipak-sleeve.

It was re-released again in 2019, re-mastered and with an additional 31 tracks.

Track listing

2019 Expanded Edition Disc One: Gratuitous Sax & Senseless Violins Remastered

2019 Expanded Edition Disc Two: Remixes / B-sides / Official Releases

2019 Expanded Edition Disc Three: Demos & Unreleased Tracks

Personnel
 Russell Mael – vocals, production
 Ron Mael – keyboards, production
 Tsui Hark and Bill Kong – guest vocals on "Tsui Hark"
 John Thomas – additional engineering and mixing
 Steve Bates – additional engineering and mixing
 Mark Stagg (for Pro-Gress and D.E.F.) – additional production on "(When I Kiss You) I Hear Charlie Parker Playing", "I Thought I Told You To Wait in the Car" and "Let's Go Surfing"
 Alan Fisch – engineering on "(When I Kiss You) I Hear Charlie Parker Playing" and "I Thought I Told You To Wait in the Car"
 Linus Burdick – additional production on "Now That I Own The BBC", "Hear No Evil, See No Evil, Speak No Evil" and "Let's Go Surfing"

Chart placings

Album

Singles

"When Do I Get To Sing 'My Way'"

"When I Kiss You (I Hear Charlie Parker Playing)"

"Now That I Own The BBC"

References 

Sparks (band) albums
1994 albums
Albums recorded in a home studio